Jakkrit Wachpirom (Thai จักรกฤษณ์ เวชภิรมย์) or simply known as Ice, is a Thai professional footballer who plays as a  right-back for Thai League 1 club Sukhothai, he has also been used as a winger.

International career

He won the 2015 AFF U-19 Youth Championship with Thailand U19. On December 2017, he play for Thailand U23 in the 2017 M-150 Cup and 2018 he squad for the 2018 AFC U-23 Championship in China.

International goals

U23

U21

U19

Honours

International

Thailand U-19
 AFF U-19 Youth Championship 
  Winners (1) : 2015

References

External links

1997 births
Living people
Jakkit Wachpirom
Jakkit Wachpirom
Association football defenders
Association football midfielders
Jakkit Wachpirom
Jakkit Wachpirom
Expatriate footballers in Japan
Thai expatriate footballers
Thai expatriate sportspeople in Japan